Penny Rafferty Hamilton (born February 18, 1948) is an American retired pilot, aviation educator, writer, and photographer. She is noted for her two-year study of women in aviation, the Teaching Women to Fly Research Project, which identified barriers to women training as pilots and presented 101 strategies to increase the participation of women in aviation. She also interests children in aviation, giving talks in schools and libraries as the character "Penny the Pilot". She and her husband jointly hold a World Aviation Speed Record set in 1991. In addition to writing for aviation magazines, she has published books on the history of Granby, Colorado, where she has resided since 1989. She was inducted into the Colorado Aviation Hall of Fame in 2011 and the Colorado Women's Hall of Fame in 2014.

Early life, education, and career
Penny Rafferty was born on February 18, 1948, in Pennsylvania. She earned her bachelor's degree from Columbia University, and an associate of arts degree in dental hygiene education from Temple University in 1968.

She began working as a dental hygienist in a preventative dental clinic which she managed in Rhode Island, where she met her husband, a career military officer. Together they lived in different locations in the US and abroad, including Germany. Upon his retirement in 1979, they settled in Nebraska. They both attended the University of Nebraska, where she earned a master's degree in adult and continuing education and a Ph.D. in communications. She submitted her thesis on "The Dental Hygienist: The First Half-Century, 1913 to 1963".

Hamilton worked as a professor of communications at the University of Nebraska while writing an advice column for the Sun Newspapers chain. She also hosted a radio program, and appeared weekly on television. Later she and her husband purchased a newspaper and opened a management consultancy and public relations business called Advanced Research Institute. One of their clients was the Aircraft Owners and Pilots Association.

Aviation activities
Hamilton became interested in flying after serving as a navigation and radio controller for her husband. She received her pilot's license in 1988. They set a World Aviation Speed Record for their weight class, which still stands. The record was verified by the Fédération Aéronautique Internationale and the National Aeronautic Association. She retired from flying in 2007.

With an estimated 6 percent of licensed pilots in the US being women (in the UK the figure is less than 9 percent), Hamilton decided to promote the idea of flying to women and girls. Her first initiative was to interest children in aviation by giving talks in schools and library groups. She appears as the character "Penny the Pilot", dressing up in the vintage flying gear of famed woman aviator Amelia Earhart. In 2009, she received the 7 Everyday Hero Award from The Denver Channel for this initiative, and was similarly honored with the Federal Aviation Administration's Central Region Aviation Education Champion Award.

Hamilton solicited a grant from the Wolf Aviation Fund to launch the Teaching Women to Fly Research Project in 2008. This two-year study queried women flight students and pilots, and male flight instructors, to identify what prevented women from pursuing flight training. Hamilton identified ten barriers to women entering the field, including: lack of money, a perceived indifference to women students on the part of flight training schools, lack of continuity as flight instructors leave their jobs and new ones take over the class, communication difficulties between women and male flight instructors, lack of female role models, unfamiliarity with mechanical systems, lack of experience with reading maps, lack of female mentorship, and lack of emotional support from friends and family. She also proposed 101 strategies to overcome these barriers, among them: "the creation of low-interest loan programs for women in colleges and universities, web-based support communities for female pilots, and developing female friendly flight training to emphasize different learning styles and strengths". The study led to the compilation of a textbook titled Absent Aviators: Gender Issues in Aviation (Ashgate, 2014), to which Hamilton contributed a chapter, and to a planned flight instructors communication manual.

Hamilton was a co-founder of the Emily Warner Field Aviation Museum, which opened in July 2015 in the former Rocky Mountain Airways terminal in the Grand County Airport. As of 2018, she volunteers as a team leader at the museum on behalf of the Grand County Historical Association. She is also the volunteer director of the Colorado Airport History Preservation Project.

Writing

Hamilton is a frequent contributor to aviation magazines, and has written two flight instruction manuals for women pilots. She also writes articles on the history of Grand County and the town of Granby, where she presently resides. She wrote and photographed a history of Around Granby for Arcadia Publishing's "Images of America" series, a local history book called Granby, Then & Now: A quick history (2005), and a book for young children, A to Z: Your Grand County History Alphabet (2017). She wrote the national aviation career and history book called "America's Amazing Airports" in 2019.

Memberships
Hamilton is a member of the Aircraft Owners and Pilots Association, which she has served as an Airport Support Network Volunteer since 1997. She is also a member of the Colorado Pilots Association, the Colorado Aviation Historical Society, the Spirit of Flight Center, the Wings Over the Rockies Air and Space Museum, the National and Colorado 99s, and Women in Aviation International. Colorado Author's League Finalist and Award Winner in several writing categories.

Awards and honors
In 1994, a new holding intersection in the US aeronautical system, located at an altitude of 15,500 feet above sea level and west of Corona Pass, Colorado, was named for her by the Federal Aviation Administration.

In 2011, Hamilton received a Lifetime Achievement Award from the Greater Granby Area Chamber of Commerce. In 2012 she received the National Aviation Journalist Award from the National Association of State Aviation Officials. In 2013, she was honored with the Columbia University Distinguished Alumni Award for "outstanding regional and national career recognition". In 2015, Hamilton was awarded University of Nebraska Alumni Achievement Award. In 2019, she was named Grand County, Colorado, Citizen of the Year.

She was inducted into the Colorado Aviation Hall of Fame in 2011 and the Colorado Women's Hall of Fame in 2014. In 2013, her name was engraved on a plaque in the International Forest of Friendship in Atchison, Kansas.

In 2018, she was featured in a 30-minute documentary segment of the inaugural edition of the Rocky Mountain PBS series Great Colorado Women, which profiles inductees into the Colorado Women's Hall of Fame.

Personal life
In 1971, she married William Alexander Hamilton, III (born 1935), a career military officer. His postings took the couple to Washington, D.C., Germany and other locales; after his retirement in 1978, they settled in Nebraska. He has written a syndicated column since 1982. The couple has lived in Granby, Colorado, since 1989.

In 2015, Hamilton was diagnosed with breast cancer for the second time, having survived a previous diagnosis in 2007.

Bibliography

Books

Selected articles

References

External links 
Personal website
Teaching Women to Fly website
"Great Colorado Women - Penny Hamilton 'Penny the Pilot'" Rocky Mountain PBS, February 15, 2018

Living people
1948 births
Flight speed record holders
Aviators from Colorado
American women children's writers
American children's writers
People from Grand County, Colorado
Columbia University alumni
Temple University alumni
University of Nebraska–Lincoln alumni
American women aviation record holders
21st-century American women